Shivagiri is a temple that houses an  statue of Lord Shiva that has been builty by the T.K. Patil Banakatti Charitable Trust in the city of Bijapur, Karnataka, India, on the Sindagi Road. It is slowly becoming a pilgrimage location and one of the highest visited tourist locations in Bijapur. On Maha Shivaratri, every year, it is estimated that the temple is visited by over 150,000 devotees. The temple was built by Mr. Basantkumar Patil, in memory of his father, in his hometown of Bijapur. 

The 1,500 tonnes statue of Lord Shiva is considered as the second largest resting statue of Lord Shiva in India and was prepared by sculptors from Shimoga for over 13 months. The civilian design was supplied by Bangalore-situated architects. The idol of Lord Shiva is made of cement and steel. A small Shiva Linga has been placed beneath the statue. Also, the "Shiva Charite" will be engraved on the inside walls of the Temple in the Kannada language to help devotees learn the mythological stories related to Shiva. The Trust wants to make it a major pilgrimage centre.

Public interest has been anticipated by the Trust with the series of charity work relating to the statue. An old age home is proposed on the  sprawling premises named Basant Vana. One of the five brothers who make up the Trustees, Mr Patil, told The Hindu newspaper that initially it will accommodate 52 members and the capacity will be enhanced gradually. Women would be given preference in admission. Once this is stabilised, the Trust will establish a free boarding school for meritorious students from economically and socially deprived classes.

Mr. Patil and his brothers plan to weigh their mother Tulasibayi with gold on 26 February . As she weighs , the gold is estimated to be Rs. 4.5 crores and this money will be deposited in a bank and interest from it will be used for the associated charity work.

References
Shivagiri - allaboutbijapur.in
85-foot idol at Shivagiri attracts huge crowd
Shivagiri - Bijapur District
People throng Shivagiri to celebrate Mahashivaratri - Times of India

Bijapur, Karnataka
Tourist attractions in Bijapur district